Presil is a village in the municipality of Kruševo, North Macedonia.

Demographics
Presil is attested in the Ottoman defter of 1467/68 as a village in the vilayet of Manastir. The majority of the inhabitants attested bore typical Albanian anthroponyms.

According to the 2021 census, the village had a total of 574 inhabitants. Ethnic groups in the village include:

Albanians 529 
Turks 1
Macedonians 42
Others 2

References

External links

Villages in Kruševo Municipality
Albanian communities in North Macedonia